This is the results breakdown of the local elections held in Extremadura on 24 May 2015. The following tables show detailed results in the autonomous community's most populous municipalities, sorted alphabetically.

Opinion polls

City control
The following table lists party control in the most populous municipalities, including provincial capitals (shown in bold). Gains for a party are displayed with the cell's background shaded in that party's colour.

Municipalities

Almendralejo
Population: 35,014

Badajoz
Population: 150,517

Cáceres
Population: 95,855

Mérida
Population: 58,985

Plasencia
Population: 40,892

See also
2015 Extremaduran regional election

References

Extremadura
2015